Blair Jenkins  (born 1957 in Elgin, Scotland) is a Scottish former journalist who served as chief executive of Yes Scotland in the campaign for a "Yes" vote in the 2014 Scottish independence referendum. Previously, he was Director of Broadcasting at STV, and Head of News and Current Affairs at both STV and BBC Scotland. He chaired the Scottish Broadcasting Commission in 2007–08 and the Scottish Digital Network Panel.

In June 2012, Jenkins was appointed chief executive of Yes Scotland. He is not a member of any political party and has not previously been involved with any political campaign.

Journalism career
Jenkins was named Young Journalist of the Year at the Scottish Press Awards in 1977. He spent time with BBC News in London before moving on to STV. He went on to serve as Director of Broadcasting at STV, and Head of News and Current Affairs at both STV and BBC Scotland. He later chaired the Scottish Broadcasting Commission in 2007–08 and the Scottish Digital Network Panel.

Honours
In the Queen's Birthday Honours List 2010 he was made an OBE for services to broadcasting.

References

External links
 Interview: Blair Jenkins, of Yes Scotland

1957 births
Living people
People from Elgin, Moray
Alumni of the University of Edinburgh
Scottish television executives
People educated at Elgin Academy, Moray
Officers of the Order of the British Empire